Martin Reimer (born 14 June 1987) is a German former professional road bicycle racer, who rode professionally from 2008 to 2011 and from 2013 to 2015. In 2009 he was the unlikely winner of the German National Road Race Championship.

In November 2011 he announced his early retirement from the sport of cycling. However, he changed his mind for the 2013 season and signed for team . He retired again after the 2015 season.

Major results

2008
 1st  Road race, National Under-23 Road Championships
2009
 1st  Road race, National Road Championships
 3rd Overall Tour of Britain
 4th Giro del Mendrisiotto
 9th Paris–Tours

References

External links
 
 

1987 births
Living people
German male cyclists
Sportspeople from Freiburg im Breisgau
German cycling road race champions
Cyclists from Baden-Württemberg
21st-century German people